Pitasch is a former municipality in the district of Surselva in the canton of Graubünden in Switzerland.  On 1 January 2014 the former municipalities of Pitasch, Castrisch, Ilanz, Ladir, Luven, Riein, Ruschein, Schnaus, Sevgein, Duvin, Pigniu, Rueun and Siat merged into the new municipality of Ilanz/Glion.

History
Pitasch is first mentioned about 801–50 as Pictaui though this comes from a 16th-century copy of the lost original.  In 960 it was mentioned as in Pictaso.

Geography

Of this area, 31.4% is used for agricultural purposes, while 49.1% is forested. Of the rest of the land, 1.5% is settled (buildings or roads) and the remainder (18%) is non-productive (rivers, glaciers or mountains).

The former municipality is located in the Ilanz sub-district of the Surselva district.  Before 2000 it was part of the Glenner district.  It is located south of Ilanz on a terrace between the Val Renastga and the Val da Pitasch on the old road between Castrisch over the Güner Kreuz to Safien.

Demographics
Pitasch had a population (as of 2011) of 106.  , 2.7% of the population was made up of foreign nationals.  Over the last 10 years the population has decreased at a rate of -0.9%.  Most of the population speaks Romansh(60.2%), with  the rest speaking German (39.8%).

, the gender distribution of the population was 52.2% male and 47.8% female.  The age distribution, in Pitasch is; 19 children or 16.1% of the population are between 0 and 9 years old and 26 teenagers or 22.0% are between 10 and 19.  Of the adult population, 8 people or 6.8% of the population are between 20 and 29 years old.  21 people or 17.8% are between 30 and 39, 16 people or 13.6% are between 40 and 49, and 11 people or 9.3% are between 50 and 59.  The senior population distribution is 10 people or 8.5% of the population are between 60 and 69 years old, 6 people or 5.1% are between 70 and 79, there is 1 person who is between 80 and 89.

In the 2007 federal election the most popular party was the SVP which received 41.3% of the vote.  The next three most popular parties were the FDP (26.5%), the SP (20.9%) and the CVP (11.2%).

In Pitasch about 70.1% of the population (between age 25-64) have completed either non-mandatory upper secondary education or additional higher education (either university or a Fachhochschule).

Pitasch has an unemployment rate of 2.05%.  , there were 20 people employed in the primary economic sector and about 8 businesses involved in this sector.   people are employed in the secondary sector and there are  businesses in this sector.  6 people are employed in the tertiary sector, with 3 businesses in this sector.

The historical population is given in the following table:

Heritage sites of national significance
The Swiss Reformed Church building in Pitasch is listed as a Swiss heritage site of national significance.

The Reformed Church was built in the mid-12th century into its current form.  The church floorplan is a single nave church with a single half round apse.  The interior murals date to about 1420, and on the exterior south wall is a mural of St. Martin and St. Christopher from the studio of the unknown Waltensburg Master which was painted about 1340.

References

External links

 Official website 
 

Ilanz/Glion
Former municipalities of Graubünden
Cultural property of national significance in Graubünden